Rádio Expres is a Slovak commercial radio station that broadcasts from Bratislava, Slovak Republic. It was launched in 2000. It broadcasts across more than 80 per cent of Slovakia and has a leading position in the Slovak market.

The station's format is news, traffic information and pop music. Radio Expres broadcasts via its own network of transmitters - a built-up network allows individual transmitters or groups to be disconnected from the main current and thus for specific news to be broadcast in a regional areas.

The station has been owned by Emmis Communications between 2007 and 2013. In 2013, the station was sold to its current owner, Bauer Media Group. It employs over 100 people including through its two subsidiary companies - Expres Media, s.r.o. (marketing and advertising space sales) and Expres Net, s.r.o. (technical support and transmitter operation). Its nationwide listening rate exceeds 21%, or nearly 900,000 listeners daily (MML-TGI SR 2007/II, Median SK).

External links
 Rádio Expres - Official website (Slovak)

References 

Mass media in Slovakia
Radio stations in Slovakia
Mass media in Bratislava
Bauer Media Group